Reaper was a Massachusetts privateer schooner that Captain Ephraim Sturdivant commanded during the War of 1812. Captain Sturdivant was officially charged by President James Madison to use the ship to attack British shipping. There is no evidence that she captured any British vessels.

Citations and references

Citations

References
Emmons, George Foster (1853) The navy of the United States, from the commencement, 1775 to 1853; with a brief history of each vessel’s service and fate ... Comp. by Lieut. George F. Emmons ... under the authority of the Navy Dept. To which is added a list of private armed vessels, fitted out under the American flag ... also a list of the revenue and coast survey vessels, and principal ocean steamers, belonging to citizens of the United States in 1850. (Washington: Gideon & Co.)

War of 1812 ships of the United States
Privateer ships of the United States
Schooners of the United States
1810s ships